Dmitry Vyacheslavovich Mazunov (born 12 May 1971 in Nizhny Novgorod, Russian SFSR) is a Russian table tennis player. He won a bronze medal, along with his brother Andrey Mazunov, in the men's doubles at the 1991 World Table Tennis Championships in Chiba, Japan, representing the Soviet Union. As of January 2010, Mazunov is ranked no. 105 in the world by the International Table Tennis Federation (ITTF). Mazunov is a member of TTF Liebherr Ochenhausen in Ochsenhausen, Germany, and is coached and trained by Mikhail Nosov. He is also right-handed, and uses the attacking grip.

Table tennis career
Mazunov made his official debut, as a member of the Unified Team, at the 1992 Summer Olympics in Barcelona, where he competed in both the singles and doubles tournaments. He placed third in the preliminary pool round of the men's singles, with a total score of 114 points, two defeats from Belgium's Jean-Michel Saive and Brazil's Hugo Hoyama, and a single victory over Iran's Ibrahim Al-Idokht. In the men's doubles, Mazunov and his brother Andrey lost the quarterfinal match to South Korea's Kim Taek-Soo and Yoo Nam-Kyu, with a set score of 0–3.

Representing Russia at the 1996 Summer Olympics in Atlanta, Mazunov lost the first round match of the men's singles to Belarus' Vladimir Samsonov, with a set score of 0–3. In the men's doubles, Mazunov and his partner Andrey placed second in the preliminary pool round, receiving a total score of 120 points, two victories from Belarus and the United States, and a single defeat from the South Korean duo Lee Chul-Seung and Yoo Nam-Kyu.

At the 2004 Summer Olympics in Athens, Mazunov teamed up with Alexei Smirnov in the men's doubles tournament. The Russian pair narrowly lost the bronze medal to the Danish duo Michael Maze and Finn Tugwell, receiving a final set score of 2–4.

Sixteen years after competing in his first Olympics, Mazunov qualified for his fourth Russian team, as a 37-year-old, at the 2008 Summer Olympics in Beijing, by receiving a spot as one of the remaining top 10 teams under ITTF's Computer Team Ranking List. He joined with his fellow players Alexei Smirnov and Fedor Kuzmin for the inaugural men's team event. Mazunov and his team placed fourth in the preliminary pool round against Japan, Hong Kong, and Nigeria, receiving a total score of three points and three straight losses.

References

External links
 
 NBC 2008 Olympics profile

1971 births
Living people
Russian male table tennis players
Table tennis players at the 1992 Summer Olympics
Table tennis players at the 1996 Summer Olympics
Table tennis players at the 2004 Summer Olympics
Table tennis players at the 2008 Summer Olympics
Olympic table tennis players of Russia
Olympic table tennis players of the Unified Team
Sportspeople from Nizhny Novgorod
World Table Tennis Championships medalists